Jamal Sims is an American choreographer, executive producer, director.

Career
Since 2014, Sims has regularly appeared in RuPaul’s Drag Race as a choreographer and guest judge. His directorial debut, When the Beat Drops, premiered on Logo TV in 2018.

In 2022, Sims becomes a choreographer for season 2 of RuPaul's Secret Celebrity Drag Race. It was announced to the public that Sims would be serving as executive producer and choreographer for the Beauty and the Beast television special on ABC, starring Shania Twain and Martin Short.

Personal life 
Sims is of African descent and he identifies as gay. His biggest influencer is Michael Jackson. He spent most of his childhood in Atlanta, GA.

In 2019, Sims and his life partner Octavius Terry-Sims end their marriage.

References

External links
 Jamal Sims at IMDb
 Article about Sims in The Root
 Article about Sims in Queerty

Living people
American choreographers
American directors
Year of birth missing (living people)
LGBT African Americans
American gay men
People from Atlanta
LGBT people from Georgia (U.S. state)